This article presents a list of the historical events and publications of Australian literature during 1922.

Books 

 Hilda Bridges — The Squatter's Daughter
Mary Grant Bruce — The Stone Axe of Burkamukk
 Bernard Cronin — Bluff Stakes
 Jean Curlewis — Drowning Maze
 Dulcie Deamer — The Street of the Gazelle
 Edward Dyson — The Grey Goose Comedy Company
 Havelock Ellis — Kanga Creek: An Australian Idyll
 Mary Gilmore — The Hound of the Road
 Nat Gould
 A Dangerous Stable
 Racing Rivals
 Vance Palmer — The Boss of Killara

Poetry 

 E. J. Brady — "The Coachman's Yarn"
 C. J. Dennis — "Woolloomooloo"
 Mabel Forrest
 "Kassaptu: (The Assyrian Witch)"
 Streets and Gardens
 Lesbia Harford — "The Psychological Craze"
 Henry Lawson — "On the Night Train"
 Hugh McCrae — "The Watchers"
 John Shaw Neilson — "Schoolgirls Hastening"
 Will H. Ogilvie — Galloping Shoes: Verses
 Kenneth Slessor
 "Nuremberg"
 "Pan at Lane Cove"

Children's and Young Adult fiction 

 Myra Morris — Us Five
 Ethel Turner — Jennifer, J.
 Lilian Turner — Peggy the Pilot

Short stories 

 Edward Dyson — "The Accursed Thing"
 Mary Gilmore — "On the Track to Braidwood"
 Vance Palmer — "The Black Mare"

Drama 

 C. J. Dennis & Bert Bailey — The Sentimental Bloke
 Louis Esson — The Battler

Non-fiction 

 Alec H. Chisholm — Mateship with Birds
 Mary Gaunt — Where the Twain Meet

Births 

A list, ordered by date of birth (and, if the date is either unspecified or repeated, ordered alphabetically by surname) of births in 1922 of Australian literary figures, authors of written works or literature-related individuals follows, including year of death.

 2 August — Geoffrey Dutton, poet (died 1998)
 28 August — Jacob C. Rosenberg, poet and novelist (died 2008)

Unknown date
 Peter Bladen, poet (died 2001)

Deaths 

A list, ordered by date of death (and, if the date is either unspecified or repeated, ordered alphabetically by surname) of deaths in 1922 of Australian literary figures, authors of written works or literature-related individuals follows, including year of birth.

 14 February — Bertram Stevens, editor and critic (born 1872)
25 August – Edward George Honey, journalist (born 1885)
 2 September — Henry Lawson, poet and short story writer (born 1867)

See also 
 1922 in poetry
 List of years in literature
 List of years in Australian literature
 1922 in literature
 1921 in Australian literature
 1922 in Australia
 1923 in Australian literature

References

Literature
Australian literature by year
20th-century Australian literature